Baudrier is a surname. Notable people with the surname include:

Jacqueline Baudrier (1922–2009), French radio and television journalist
Jacques Baudrier (1872–?), French sailor and Olympian
Lucien Baudrier (1861–1930), French sailor and Olympian
Yves Baudrier (1906–1988), French composer

Surnames of French origin